The Chinese Taipei Canoe Association (CTCA) is the non-governmental organization representing the sport of Canoeing in the ROC Taiwan, also known as Chinese Taipei.

History 
Chinese Taipei Canoe Association was established in 1991, and is a current member of both the International Canoe Federation and Asian Canoe Confederation.

Leadership 
Chairman
Chen, Ming-Hsiung
Vice chairman
Chiang, Chih-ming
Peng, Chun-hao
Yang, Ming-en
Lin, Wan-ju

Event hosted
 Asian Canoeing Championships (2003, 2013; all held in Nantou County)

Footnote

Remark

References

See also 
 Chinese Taipei at the Olympics

External links 
 Official website

Sports governing bodies in Taiwan
Sports organizations established in 1991
National members of the Asian Canoe Confederation